Natural is the second studio album released by British-Australian singer-songwriter Peter Andre.

Background 
Following the success of his first album in Australia, Andre was commissioned to record a second album with Melodian. However, Melodian believed that it would be wise to see if he could break the British market as well. Andre signed a joint deal with Melodian and the British record label, Mushroom UK, for his second studio album to be released in both markets. On 29 May 1995, "Turn It Up" was released. However, the record deal with Mushroom soon came under jeopardy when the label went into administration. Melodian pressed ahead with releases in Australia, releasing "Mysterious Girl" on 14 August 1995.

In January 1996, Mushroom announced that it had found a buyer for the label, meaning that it would not have to close, and that the joint deal was still in place. At this point, preparations for the album's release had been made in Australia. Three weeks before the album's release in Australia, on 12 February 1996, "Get Down On It" was released, peaking inside the top 10 of the ARIA Singles Chart. On 4 March 1996, Mushroom announced plans to continue with its releases and the second British single, "Only One", was released. On 18 March 1996, Natural was released in Australia. Mushroom announced plans to release "Mysterious Girl" as the third British single on 24 May 1996; it, had not been released on the British market due to ongoing issues over the record deal. Mushroom also announced that, due to the problems caused by the label's proposed closure, it would be reworking the album for the British market. On 2 September 1996, "Flava" was released as a single, and three weeks later, the album was released. On the week of release, the album sold 200,000 copies, and become the fastest-selling album of the year. Two further singles—"I Feel You" and "Natural"—were released; the former song was issued on 25 November 1996 and the latter was issued on 24 February 1997. Both entered the top 20 of the UK Singles Chart.

Track listing 

 Natural: The Video
 "Turn It Up" (Video)
 "Only One" (Video)
 "To The Top" (Video)
 "Mysterious Girl" (Video)
 "Flava" (Video)
 "I Feel You" (Video)
 "All I Ever Wanted" (Video)
 "Natural" (Video)
 "I Feel You" (Unplugged)
Notes
 signifies an additional producer

Charts

Year-end charts

Certifications

References 

1996 albums
Peter Andre albums
Albums produced by Cutfather
Mushroom Records albums